Miroslav Obermajer (born 5 October 1973) is a Czech former football defender. He played for Bohemians 1905 in the Czech First League, where he was captain.

In 2005, Obermajer joined Czech First League side České Budějovice in January. After the summer, Obermajer moved to FK Bohemians Prague (Střížkov) in the Bohemian Football League, where he also became captain.

Obermajer was involved with a corruption scandal involving a May 2009 Czech First League match between Bohemians (Střížkov) and Olomouc. The outcome of the scandal, settled in 2011, saw Olomouc goalkeeper Petr Drobisz suspended for 18 months for giving a bribe of 300,000 CZK to Obermajer, but Obermajer himself was acquitted.

References

External links 
 
 

1973 births
Living people
Czech footballers
Czech First League players
Bohemians 1905 players
SK Dynamo České Budějovice players
FK Bohemians Prague (Střížkov) players
Association football defenders